Kellyia is a genus of thrips in the family Phlaeothripidae.

Species
 Kellyia bagnalli
 Kellyia biadenes
 Kellyia froggatti
 Kellyia giraulti
 Kellyia hoodianus
 Kellyia karnyi
 Kellyia milmani
 Kellyia moultoni
 Kellyia palmerae
 Kellyia pitkini
 Kellyia priesneri
 Kellyia stannardi
 Kellyia wilsoni

References

Phlaeothripidae
Thrips genera